Wolcott–Rallison syndrome, WRS, is a rare, autosomal recessive disorder with infancy-onset diabetes mellitus, multiple epiphyseal dysplasia, osteopenia, mental retardation or developmental delay, and hepatic and renal dysfunction as main clinical findings. Patients with WRS have mutations in the EIF2AK3 gene, which encodes the eukaryotic translation initiation factor 2-alpha kinase 3.
 Other disease names include multiple epiphyseal dysplasia and early-onset diabetes mellitus. Most patients with this disease do not survive to adulthood . The majority of WRS patients die from fulminant hepatitis during childhood. There are few reported cases for this disease. Of the 54 families worldwide with reported WRS cases, 22.2% of them are from the Kingdom of Saudi Arabia. Of the 23 WRS patients in Saudi Arabia, all but one is the result of consanguineous marriages.  Another country where WRS cases have been found is Kosovo. Here, the Albanian population is also known for consanguineous marriages, but there were some cases involving patients from non-consanguineous parents that were carriers for the same mutant allele.

Genetics
The main focus for this autosomal recessive disease is mutations to the EIF2AK3 gene. This gene is located on the short arm of chromosome 2 (2p11.2). In unrelated families, different mutations have been observed in the EIF2AK3 gene, including missense and nonsense mutations. For some cases for unrelated families, identical mutations were rarely observed.

The EIKF2AK3 gene codes for PERK (pancreatic endoplasmic reticulum kinase), an explanation for the spectrum of symptoms. PERK is associated with the activity of beta cells in the pancreas. Beta cells are needed for the proper release of insulin into the blood stream after an increase in blood glucose. This kinase is needed for the control of protein levels in the endoplasmic reticulum and is linked to ribosome activity. The endoplasmic reticulum is a major protein sorting and processing center in every body cell. A broad range of bodily systems is affected, including pancreas, kidney, liver, bone, and nervous system, because of deficient stress response to improperly folded proteins inside the endoplasmic reticulum. This is part of the reason why patients suffer from multiple epiphyseal dysplasia and osteopenia.

Diagnosis
Initially, patients with neonatal or early-childhood onset diabetes are possible candidates for having Wolcott–Rallison syndrome. The other features include multiple epiphyseal dysplasia, osteopenia, intellectual disability, and hepatic and renal dysfunction. Patients having features that suggest Wolcott–Rallison syndrome can be referred for genetics testing. The key way to test for this disease is through genetic testing for EIKF2AK3 mutations. Molecular genetic analysis can be done for the patient and the parents to test for inherited or de novo mutations. It can also show whether the patient's parents are heterozygotes or homozygotes for the normal genotype. X-rays can show bone age in relation to actual age. In typical WRS patients the bone age is a few years less than the chronological age. Hypothyroidism is rare in WRS patients but can occur.

Treatment

The most common method to manage hyperglycemia and diabetes is with an insulin pump. In infants and very young children long-acting insulins like Glargine and Levemir are preferred to prevent recurrent hypoglycemia. As soon as Walcott-Rallison  syndrome is the diagnosis, therapy plans need to be drawn up along with frequent checkups to monitor kidney and liver function and adjust insulin treatment. In the few cases that develop hypothyroidism, treatment with thyroxine is indicated, with the target to maintain normal circulating thyroid stimulating hormone (thyrotropin) concentrations.

References

External links 
 

Diabetes
Rare diseases
Autosomal recessive disorders
Syndromes